The Socialist Organisation of Working People (SOP, Czech: Socialistická organizace pracujících) is a Trotskyist political group in the Czech Republic established in 1998 after a split in the group affiliate to the International Socialist Tendency, Socialist Solidarity. It is a section of the League for the Fifth International.

In their words: "SOP follows revolutionary traditions of Marx, Engels, Lenin and Trotsky, striving to build a revolutionary worker's party". They established an independent youth group, called REVO, in 2000. Revo had a split in 2006.

External links
Party website (in Czech)
Early years of the party (in Czech)
REVO
Far-left politics in the Czech Republic
League for the Fifth International
Trotskyist organizations in the Czech Republic